Croton Point Park is a Westchester County park in the village of Croton-on-Hudson.

The park has several public attractions including a miniature aircraft airport, boat launch, tent and RV camping, cabin rental,
cross-country skiing, fishing, group picnicking, hiking and walking trails, a museum, nature study, pavilions, a playground, swimming, and a beach.

History
In the 1800s the Underhill family owned the land that is now Croton Point Park. Grapes, watermelons, and apples were grown. A brickyard was also on the property. A few buildings built with these bricks are still standing at Croton Point. The park is also home to several historic sites such as a set of wine cellars from an old manor.

A substantial portion of the land on which the park is situated today was the site of a landfill, which was operated by the Westchester County government from 1927 to 1986. The landfill has since been capped off and restored to green space. A 1931 map shows the landfill area as marsh.

Events
The park hosts a number of events each year, including the annual Hudson River Sloop Clearwater festival, the Croton Point Shindig, and Hudson River Eagle Fest.

References

External links

 Official county website

Parks on the Hudson River
Parks in Westchester County, New York
Nature centers in New York (state)
Beaches of Westchester County, New York
Hudson River School sites